Parliamentary elections were held in Ecuador in 1947.

Results

References

Elections in Ecuador
Ecuador
1947 in Ecuador
Election and referendum articles with incomplete results